Santonio Beard (February 14, 1980 – February 5, 2022) was an American college football player who was a running back for the University of Alabama. He left just after his junior season in 2002. Beard's most productive season came in 2002 after the exit of Ahmaad Galloway due to injury.  Beard rushed for close to 900 yards his junior season, despite splitting carries with former Crimson Tide running back Shaud Williams.  He currently shares a University of Alabama record for the most touchdowns in a single game with five. He is tied with NFL running back Shaun Alexander and wide receiver DeVonta Smith. This feat was achieved in 2002 against the University of Mississippi.

Beard's most notable game came against the Auburn Tigers in 2001, in which he and Ahmaad Galloway rushed for close to 300 yards combined.  This led to the Crimson Tide's second victory against Auburn University at Jordan–Hare Stadium.

Professional career 
After coach Dennis Franchione's departure, Beard decided to forgo his senior year.  However, he was undrafted and signed with the B.C. Lions of the Canadian Football League. He played for the Denver Broncos but was cut after the first season.

Life after football 
After his football career ended, Beard encountered numerous legal problems, often involving illegal drugs.  Beard was shot dead in Lithonia, Georgia, on February 5, 2022, at the age of 41.

References

1980 births
2022 deaths
Denver Broncos players
Alabama Crimson Tide football players
African-American players of American football
American football running backs
Players of American football from Nashville, Tennessee
Deaths by firearm in Georgia (U.S. state)